The Morane-Saulnier L, or Morane-Saulnier Type L, or officially MoS-3, was a French parasol wing one or two-seat scout aeroplane of the First World War. The Type L became one of the first successful fighter aircraft when it was fitted with a single machine gun that fired through the arc of the propeller, which was protected by armoured deflector wedges. Its immediate effectiveness in this role launched an arms race in fighter development, and the Type L was swiftly rendered obsolete. The original Type L used wing warping for lateral control, but a later version designated Type LA was fitted with ailerons.

Built by Morane-Saulnier, large numbers of the Type L were ordered by the French Aviation Militaire at the outbreak of the war. In total about 600 Type Ls were built and, in addition to the French air force, they served with the Royal Flying Corps, Royal Naval Air Service and the Imperial Russian Air Service.

The type was also produced under licence in Germany by Pfalz Flugzeugwerke as the unarmed A.I and A.II scouts (with 80 HP and 100 HP Oberursel engines respectively). About 60 were built for Bavarian air service. A few were later modified as the E.III fighters.  A few Type Ls captured by Germany were fitted with a single German Spandau LMG 08 machine gun. These captured and converted aircraft are often mistaken for Pfalz E.IIIs.

About 450 aircraft were licence-built in Russia by Duks and Lebed works.

The Morane-Saulnier L was also built under licence in Sweden with some minor improvements as the Thulin D.

Operational history

In December 1914 the famous French aviator Roland Garros, then serving with Escadrille 23, worked with Raymond Saulnier to create a gun synchronizer, using the gas operated Hotchkiss light machine gun. However the firing rate fluctuated too much for the synchronizer to function properly. As an interim measure, they then designed a "safety backup" in the form of braced "deflectors" (metal wedges) fitted to the rear surfaces of the propeller blades at the points where they could be struck by a bullet. Garros took his Type L fighter into combat with the deflectors in March 1915 and achieved immediate success, shooting down three German aircraft in April, a noteworthy feat at the time. The bullets that the French used were not likely to damage the harder steel of the wedges themselves. On 18 April 1915, Garros' deflector-equipped Type L force-landed behind German lines and was captured before he could destroy it.

Three two-seat Morane Type L aircraft were also the first victims of the first German fighter aircraft.  Leutnant Kurt Wintgens, flying the Parabellum machine gun-armed Fokker Eindecker M.5K/MG prototype E.5/15, a copy of the Morane-Saulnier H with a wire-braced welded steel tube fuselage and fitted with the Fokker Stangensteuerung synchronized gun, downed the first on July 1, 1915, followed by two similar victories on July 4 and 15.

About 50 Type Ls were delivered to Britain's Royal Flying Corps, which used them as reconnaissance aircraft during 1915, with a further 25 being operated by the Royal Naval Air Service. On 7 June 1915 one of these aircraft, flown by Flight Sub-Lieutenant Reginald Alexander John Warneford of 1 Squadron RNAS intercepted the Deutsches Heer-flown Zeppelin LZ.37, destroying it, the first Zeppelin to be destroyed in the air. Warneford received the Victoria Cross for this achievement.

Cecil Lewis served with the RFC's Squadron Number 3 in 1916 through the Somme offensive. He flew the Type LA "Parasol" (as it was known) operationally, for over three hundred hours and was awarded the Military Cross. Most of that flying was conducted on a single airframe, RFC serial 5133. In his book "Sagittarius Rising" he recalled of the LA:

"I had a look over her, and the more I saw of her the less I liked her. It was certainly not love at first sight . . . the elevator was as sensitive as a gold balance; the least movement stood you on your head or on your tail. You couldn't leave the machine to its own devices for a moment . . . the Morane really was a death trap . . . Subsequently I flew every machine used by the Air Force during the war. They were all child's play after the Morane . . . but I did come to love the Morane as I loved no other aeroplane."

Three Pfalz A.II's were used by the Ottoman Empire in an attempt to combat the growing threat of the Arab Revolt

A Morane-Saulnier "Parasol" was used for the first flight by an airplane across the Andes on April 13, 1918, when the Argentine aviator Luis Candelaria flew from Zapala, Argentina, to Cunco, Chile; the flight lasted 2 hours 30 minutes and reached an altitude of 4,000 meters.

Variants
 L company designation for basic model
 MoS-3 official government/STAe designation for L
 LA  company designation for improved L with faired fuselage and ailerons
 MoS-4 official government/STAe designation for LA
 LH fighter developed from LA
 MoS-20 official government/STAe designation for LH
 Pfalz A.I with Oberursel U.0 engine
 Pfalz A.II with Oberursel U.I engine
 Pfalz E.III - A Pfalz A.II armed with single synchronised lMG 08 machine gun
 Thulin D modified L built under licence in Sweden.

Operators

 Argentine Air Force - One aircraft

 Belgian Air Force

 Brazilian Army Aviation

Czechoslovakian Air Force - One aircraft

 Finnish Air Force - Two aircraft

 French Air Force
 
Royal Netherlands Air Force - One aircraft.

 Peruvian Air Force

Polish Air Force

 Romanian Air Corps

 Imperial Russian Air Service

 Swedish Air Force - One aircraft
 
 Swiss Air Force - One aircraft

 Ottoman Air Force - Original and Pfalz A.II aircraft.
 
 Ukrainian Air Force - Three aircraft.

 Soviet Air Force - ex-Imperial Russian Air Service aircraft.

 Royal Flying Corps
 No. 1 Squadron RFC
 No. 3 Squadron RFC
 No. 30 Squadron RFC
 Royal Naval Air Service

Specifications (Type L)

See also

References

Notes

Bibliography
 Angelucci, Enzo. The Rand McNally Encyclopedia of Military Aircraft, 1914-1980. San Diego, California: The Military Press, 1983. .
 Bruce, J.M. Morane Saulnier Type L - Windsock Datafile 16.  Herts, UK: Albatros Publications, 1989. .
 Bruce, J.M. The Aeroplanes of the Royal Flying Corps (Military Wing). London: Putnam, 1982. .
 
 Green, William and Gordon Swanborough. The Complete Book of Fighters. New York: Smithmark, 1994. .

 The Illustrated Encyclopedia of Aircraft. London: Aerospace Publishing, 1985.

 Nicolle, David. The Ottoman Army 1914-1918: Disease and Death on the Battlefield. Oxford, UK: Osprey Publishing, 1994. .
 Taylor, Michael J. H. Jane's Encyclopedia of Aviation. London: Studio Editions, 1989.
 Thetford, Owen. British Naval Aircraft since 1912. London: Putnam, Fourth edition, 1978. .

Further reading

1910s French fighter aircraft
1910s French military reconnaissance aircraft
Military aircraft of World War I
L
1910s French military trainer aircraft
Parasol-wing aircraft
Single-engined tractor aircraft
Aircraft first flown in 1913
Rotary-engined aircraft